Nursing Management is a monthly nursing journal covering the practice of nursing management. It is published by RCNi. It continues Supervisor Nurse and absorbed Recruitment, Retention & Restructuring Report.

See also
 List of nursing journals

External links 
 

General nursing journals
Publications established in 1994
English-language journals
Royal College of Nursing publications
10 times per year journals